The 2004 Nevada Democratic presidential caucuses took place on February 14, 2004 as part of the 2004 United States Democratic presidential primaries. The delegate allocation is Proportional. The candidates were awarded delegates in proportion to the percentage of votes received and the caucus was open to registered Democrats only. A total of 20 delegates are awarded proportionally. A 15 percent threshold was required to receive delegates. Frontrunner John Kerry won the primary with Governor Howard Dean coming in a distant second. Kerry won the Democratic nomination for President of the United States, but lost the general election to incumbent George W. Bush.

Statewide Results

See also
Democratic Party (United States) presidential primaries, 2004

References

Nevada
2004 Nevada elections
2004